The Team classification in the Giro d'Italia, also known as the Trofeo Fast Team, is a prize that is contested in the Giro d'Italia. It has been awarded since the race's inception. In more recent editions the classification is calculated by adding up the top three riders' times from each team for each stage, and then the team with the lowest total time is the leader of the classification. In case of a tie, the teams are separated by the sum of the places obtained by their three best riders at the finish. In 2012, the first team received a bonus of €500, the second a premium of 300 euros and last a premium of 100 euros. A total of 18,900 euros has been awarded for this award during the race (21 stages).

Winners

Team classification

Team points classification (1993–2017)

See also
 Team classification in the Tour de France
 Team classification in the Vuelta a España

References

Giro d'Italia
Cycling jerseys
Italian sports trophies and awards